George, Prince of Serbia may refer to:

 George Branković, Prince of Serbia, ruled as prince (1427-1429) and despot (1429-1456)
 George, Crown Prince of Serbia (b. 1887 – d. 1972), crown prince of Serbia from 1903 to 1909

See also
 Prince of Serbia